Dura Den is a small, 3 km-long wooded gorge that is located near Cupar in northeastern Fife, Scotland. This narrow cleft follows a course between the villages of Kemback to the north and Pitscottie to the south. A small stream, named the Ceres (or Kame) Burn, follows the course of this gorge and this flow includes small waterfalls near the midpoint. Historically the Ceres Burn was used to power jute spinning mills

Around 1859, the geologist and Newburgh minister John Anderson discovered what turned out to be extensive sandstone deposits of ganoid fossilized fish in this area.

The woods include ash, oak, and hazel.

External links
 The Fossil Fishes of Dura Den

Geography of Fife
Landforms of Fife
Canyons and gorges of Scotland
Forests and woodlands of Scotland